Patrick Kennedy (1832 – June 30, 1895) was an Irish-born contractor and political figure in Quebec. He represented Montréal division no. 6 in the Legislative Assembly of Quebec from 1892 to 1895 as a Conservative.

He was born in Trasersten, County Tipperary, the son of Edward Kennedy. He was a carter and general contractor. In 1861, he married Elizabeth Tracey. Kennedy served on Montreal city council from 1877 to 1883 and from 1887 to 1894. He was president of the Montreal police commission from 1882 to 1883. Kennedy died in office in Montreal at the age of 63 and was buried in the Notre-Dame-des-Neiges Cemetery.

References
 

Politicians from County Tipperary
Conservative Party of Quebec MNAs
1832 births
1895 deaths
Service de police de la Ville de Montréal
Quebec people of Irish descent
Irish emigrants to pre-Confederation Quebec
Anglophone Quebec people
Burials at Notre Dame des Neiges Cemetery